Motor Racing Outreach is a non-denominational Christian Protestant organization that serves the NASCAR Cup Series, NASCAR Xfinity Series, and various other levels and forms of motorsports across the United States.

History
Motor Racing Outreach (MRO) is a non-profit organization founded in 1988 to serve the Cup Series community. It was founded by Max Helton in response to a need presented by three drivers within the series who were unable to attend regular church services due to the demands of their schedule.

References

External links
 go2mro.com

NASCAR
Christian sports organizations